Jonathan Correia Da Fonseca (born 13 February 1994) is a Monégasque former footballer who played as a left-back.

Club career
Correia Da Fonseca is a youth exponent from OGC Nice. He made his Ligue 1 debut on 15 August 2015 against Troyes AC. He played the full game.

References

1994 births
Living people
Association football defenders
French footballers
Ligue 1 players
OGC Nice players
En Avant Guingamp players